Ione is a city in Amador County, California. The population was 7,918 at the 2010 census, up from 7,129 in 2000. Once known as "Bed-Bug" and "Freeze Out," Ione was an important supply center on the main road to the Mother Lode and Southern Mines during the California Gold Rush.

History 
Ione is the historical home of the Sierra Miwok people, an indigenous people of California. In 1840, the future town site became part of the Mexican land grant Rancho Arroyo Seco in Alta California.

The town is located in the fertile Ione Valley, which is believed to have been named by Thomas Brown around 1849 after one of the heroines in Edward Bulwer-Lyttons drama The Last Days of Pompeii, but conflicting legends and sources for the name exist. During the days of the Gold Rush, the miners knew the town by the names of "Bedbug" and "Freezeout." Unlike other communities in Amador County, which were founded on gold mining, Ione was a supply center, stage and rail stop, and agricultural hub.

The first post office opened in 1852. The town of Ione continued to grow and prosper after its gold rush founding. The first school was built in 1853. The historic Methodist Church was organized in 1853 and the structure was completed in 1862. The first flour mill was built in 1855. The first brick building was built by Daniel Stewart, D. Stewart Company Store, in 1855 for his general merchandise store and is still owned and operated by the same family. In March 1865, Camp Jackson was built nearby, garrisoned by Company D, 2nd California Volunteer Cavalry, who stayed for three months until moving on to a new post.

At the centennial celebration of 1876, Ione had a population of about 600 which included about 100 Chinese who lived in Ione's Chinatown. The town included one public school, four churches, four general stores, one meat market, one laundry, one brewery, a restaurant, millinery shop, an art gallery, six saloons, a drug store and barber shop, and many other business establishments. The centennial also celebrated the completion of the Stockton and Ione Railroad, which had been incorporated in 1873 to build a 40 miles (64.4 km) long narrow gauge railroad from Stockton via Linden to Ione, which operated only until 1876. The centennial celebration was the beginning of what is now known as the Ione Homecoming. This annual celebration has been held during the month of May almost every year since that first Centennial celebration in 1876 and is now held on the second full weekend in May every year.

The City of Ione was incorporated as a General Law City in 1953.

Ione has many landmarks and historical points of interest. Three are listed as California Historical Landmarks:
 The Preston School of Industry, known as The Castle, was built between 1890–1894 to serve as a school for juveniles referred by the courts. The Castle is currently not in use, but the Preston Castle Foundation is working to help restore it.
Community Methodist Church of Ione
 D. Stewart Company Store (#788)

Dave Brubeck, the famous jazz pianist, was raised in Ione and in 1998 scored a video tour of the castle called "A Castle's Song", sold through KVIE to help fund the restoration efforts.

Geography 

Climate
According to the Köppen Climate Classification system, Ione has a warm-summer Mediterranean climate, abbreviated "Csa" on climate maps.

Demographics

2010
At the 2010 census Ione had a population of 7,918. The racial makeup of Ione was 5,826 (73.6%) White, 824 (10.4%) African American, 173 (2.2%) Native American, 110 (1.4%) Asian, 21 (0.3%) Pacific Islander, 678 (8.6%) from other races, and 286 (3.6%) from two or more races. Hispanic or Latino of any race were 1,991 persons (25.1%).

The census reported that 3,746 people (47.3% of the population) lived in households, 12 (0.2%) lived in non-institutionalized group quarters, and 4,160 (52.5%) were institutionalized.

There were 1,466 households, 482 (32.9%) had children under the age of 18 living in them, 810 (55.3%) were opposite-sex married couples living together, 159 (10.8%) had a female householder with no husband present, 77 (5.3%) had a male householder with no wife present. There were 84 (5.7%) unmarried opposite-sex partnerships, and 6 (0.4%) same-sex married couples or partnerships. 335 households (22.9%) were one person and 143 (9.8%) had someone living alone who was 65 or older. The average household size was 2.56. There were 1,046 families (71.4% of households); the average family size was 2.99.

The age distribution was 1,060 people (13.4%) under the age of 18, 648 people (8.2%) aged 18 to 24, 2,880 people (36.4%) aged 25 to 44, 2,550 people (32.2%) aged 45 to 64, and 780 people (9.9%) who were 65 or older. The median age was 41.5 years. For every 100 females, there were 310.5 males. For every 100 females age 18 and over, there were 366.5 males.

There were 1,635 housing units at an average density of ,of which 1,466 were occupied, 1,026 (70.0%) by the owners and 440 (30.0%) by renters. The homeowner vacancy rate was 4.2%; the rental vacancy rate was 9.9%. 2,574 people (32.5% of the population) lived in owner-occupied housing units and 1,172 people (14.8%) lived in rental housing units.

2000

At the 2000 census there were 7,129 people in 1,081 households, including 780 families, in the city. The racial makeup of the city was 57.90% White, 17.83% Black or African American, 2.30% Native American, 1.68% Asian, 0.17% Pacific Islander, 18.12% from other races, and 1.99% from two or more races. 20.16% of the population were [[Hispanics The age distribution was 17.8% under the age of 18, 13.6% from 18 to 24, 45.0% from 25 to 44, 18.0% from 45 to 64, and 5.6% 65 or older. The median age was 34 years. For every 100 females, there were 380.4 males. For every 100 females age 18 and over, there were 449.1 males.

The median household income was $40,625 and the median family income was $48,911. Males had a median income of $26,922 versus $23,633 for females. The per capita income for the city was $20,340. About 9.3% of families and 11.0% of the population were below the poverty line, including 14.8% of those under age 18 and 4.5% of those age 65 or over.

Government

Politics

State government
Mule Creek State Prison is located in the community. Adjacent to Mule Creek is the California Department of Forestry and Fire Protection Training Academy, which trains staff from all over California, as well as the Preston Youth Correctional Facility (formerly the Preston School of Industry, deactivated in 2011). According to the Mule Creek State Prison website, there are 3,782 prisoners residing in the facility, well above the designed capacity of 1,700, and they account for over half of Ione's population.

Notable people
 Tiny Bonham, baseball player
 Dave Brubeck, jazz pianist and composer
Justin Grant, racing driver
Merle Haggard, singer and songwriter

See also

References

External links

 

Cities in Amador County, California
Incorporated cities and towns in California
Populated places established in 1849
1849 establishments in California